Hyden may refer to:

Hyden (surname)
Hyden, Kentucky, USA
Hyden, Western Australia